Pendle is a constituency in Lancashire represented in the House of Commons of the UK Parliament since 2010 by Andrew Stephenson, a Conservative. The constituency was newly created for the 1983 general election, being largely formed from the former Nelson and Colne constituency.

Boundaries

Since its formation in 1983, the Pendle constituency has been coterminous with the borough of the same name; however the constituency boundaries were redrawn in 1997, due to local government boundary changes in the 1980s.

The major urban centres in Pendle are Nelson and Colne, with smaller towns Barnoldswick and Earby added to existing ones such as Higham and Pendleside and Craven, since boundary changes in the 1970s that brought them into Pendle Borough, Lancashire from Yorkshire.

Parliament accepted the Boundary Commission's Fifth Periodic Review of Westminster constituencies calling for slight changes in the run-up to the 2010 general election, since which Pendle has the same electoral wards as the Borough:
 Barrowford; Blacko and Higherford; Boulsworth; Bradley; Brierfield; Clover Hill; Coates; Craven; Earby; Foulridge; Higham and Pendleside; Horsfield; Marsden; Old Laund Booth; Reedley; Southfield; Vivary Bridge; Walverden; Waterside; Whitefield

Constituency profile
Although in 1992 this was not a bellwether, this is a key marginal with the Conservative lead over Labour being similar to the national lead in the 2010 general election. In terms of the local economy, unemployment is lower than the regional average, artisan creations, tourism, manufacturing, transport, food processing, the public sector and agriculture are large sectors.

Members of Parliament

Elections

Elections in the 2010s

Elections in the 2000s

Elections in the 1990s

Elections in the 1980s

See also
List of parliamentary constituencies in Lancashire

Notes

References

Parliamentary constituencies in North West England
Constituencies of the Parliament of the United Kingdom established in 1983
Borough of Pendle